McCorry is a surname. Notable people with the surname include:

Bill McCorry (1887–1973), American baseball player
Marion McCorry (born 1945), American actor